The 1900 Grand National was the 62nd renewal of the Grand National horse race that took place at Aintree near Liverpool, England, on 30 March 1900.

Finishing Order

Non-finishers

References

 1900
Grand National
Grand National
19th century in Lancashire